In functional analysis, a uniform algebra A on a compact Hausdorff topological space X is a closed (with respect to the uniform norm) subalgebra of the C*-algebra C(X) (the continuous complex-valued functions on X) with the following properties:
the constant functions are contained in A
 for every x, y  X there is fA with f(x)f(y). This is called separating the points of X.

As a closed subalgebra of the commutative Banach algebra C(X) a uniform algebra is itself a unital commutative Banach algebra (when equipped with the uniform norm). Hence, it is, (by definition) a Banach function algebra.

A uniform algebra A on X is said to be natural if the maximal ideals of A are precisely the ideals  of functions vanishing at a point x in X.

Abstract characterization 
If A is a unital commutative Banach algebra such that  for all a in A, then there is a compact Hausdorff X such that A is isomorphic as a Banach algebra to a uniform algebra on X. This result follows from the spectral radius formula and the Gelfand representation.

Notes

References 

Functional analysis
Banach algebras